General elections were held in American Samoa on 7 November 2006.

Results

House of Representatives

Delegate to the American House of Representatives

Elections in American Samoa
General
2006 American Samoa elections
United States House of Representatives elections in American Samoa
American Samoa